Arraias River may refer to several rivers in Brazil:

 Arraias River (Mato Grosso)
 Arraias River (Pará)
 Arraias River (Tocantins)
 Arraias do Araguaia River